Winston Churchill, in addition to his careers of soldier and politician, was a prolific writer under the pen name 'Winston S. Churchill'. After being commissioned into the 4th Queen's Own Hussars in 1895, Churchill gained permission to observe the Cuban War of Independence, and sent war reports to The Daily Graphic. He continued his war journalism in British India, at the Siege of Malakand, then in the Sudan during the Mahdist War and in southern Africa during the Second Boer War.

Churchill's fictional output included one novel and a short story, but his main output comprised non-fiction. After he was elected as an MP, over 130 of his speeches or parliamentary answers were also published in pamphlets or booklets; many were subsequently published in collected editions. Churchill received the Nobel Prize in Literature in 1953 "for his mastery of historical and biographical description as well as for brilliant oratory in defending exalted human values".

Writing career

In 1895 Winston Churchill was commissioned cornet (second lieutenant) into the 4th Queen's Own Hussars. His annual pay was £300, and he calculated he needed an additional £500 to support a style of life equal to that of other officers of the regiment. To earn the required funds, he gained his colonel's agreement to observe the Cuban War of Independence; his mother, Lady Randolph Churchill, used her influence to secure a contract for her son to send war reports to The Daily Graphic. He was subsequently posted back to his regiment, then based in British India, where he took part in, and reported on the Siege of Malakand; the reports were published in The Pioneer and The Daily Telegraph. The reports formed the basis of his first book, The Story of the Malakand Field Force, which was published in 1898. To relax he also wrote his only novel, Savrola, which was published in 1898. That same year he was transferred to the Sudan to take part in the Mahdist War (1881–1899), where he participated in the Battle of Omdurman in September 1898. He published his recollections in The River War (1899).

In 1899 Churchill resigned his commission and travelled to South Africa as the correspondent with The Morning Post, on a salary of £250 a month plus all expenses, to report on the Second Boer War. He was captured by the Boers in November that year, but managed to escape. He remained in the country and continued to send in his reports to the newspaper. He subsequently published his despatches in two works, London to Ladysmith via Pretoria and Ian Hamilton's March (both 1900). He returned to Britain in 1900 and was elected as the Member of parliament for the Oldham constituency at that year's general election.

As a serving MP he began publishing pamphlets containing his speeches or answers to key parliamentary questions. Beginning with Mr Winston Churchill on the Education Bill (1902), over 135 such tracts were published over his career. Many of these were subsequently compiled into collections, several of which were edited by his son, Randolph and others of which were edited by Charles Eade, the editor of the Sunday Dispatch. In addition to his parliamentary duties, Churchill wrote a two-volume biography of his father, Lord Randolph Churchill, published in 1906, in which he "presented his father as a tory with increasingly radical sympathies", according to the historian Paul Addison.

In the 1923 general election Churchill lost his parliamentary seat and moved to the south of France where he wrote The World Crisis, a six-volume history of the First World War, published between 1923 and 1931. The book was well-received, although the former Prime Minister Arthur Balfour dismissed the work as "Winston's brilliant autobiography, disguised as world history". At the 1924 general election Churchill returned to the Commons. In 1930 he wrote his first autobiography, My Early Life, after which he began his researches for Marlborough: His Life and Times (1933–1938), a four-volume biography of his ancestor, John Churchill, 1st Duke of Marlborough. Before the final volume was published, Churchill wrote a series of biographical profiles for newspapers, which were later collected together and published as Great Contemporaries (1937).

In May 1940, eight months after the outbreak of the Second World War, Churchill became Prime Minister. He wrote no histories during his tenure, although several collections of his speeches were published. At the end of the war he was voted out of office at the 1945 election; he returned to writing and, with a research team headed by the historian William Deakin, produced a six-volume history, The Second World War (1948–1953). The books became a best-seller in both the UK and US. Churchill served as Prime Minister for a second time between October 1951 and April 1955 before resigning the premiership; he continued to serve as an MP until 1964. His final major work was the four-volume work A History of the English-Speaking Peoples (1956–1958). In 1953 Churchill was awarded the Nobel Prize in Literature "for his mastery of historical and biographical description as well as for brilliant oratory in defending exalted human values". Churchill was almost always well paid as an author and, for most of his life, writing was his main source of income. He produced a huge portfolio of written work; the journalist and historian Paul Johnson estimates that Churchill wrote an estimated eight to ten million words in more than forty books, thousands of newspaper and magazine articles, and at least two film scripts. John Gunther in 1939 estimated that he earned $100,000 a year ($ in ) from writing and lecturing, but that "of this he spends plenty".

When demand was high for his newspaper and magazine articles, Churchill employed a ghostwriter. During 1934, for example, Churchill was commissioned by Collier's, the News of the World, the Daily Mail - and, added that year, the Sunday Dispatch, for which the newspaper's editor, William Blackwood, employed Adam Marshall Diston to rework Churchill's old material (Churchill himself would write one new piece in every four published by the Dispatch). Later in the year, when Churchill had less time to write, at the recommendation of Blackwood he employed Diston directly as his ghostwriter. Diston wrote, for example, Churchill's remaining Collier's articles for the year, being paid £15 from the £350 commission Churchill received for each article. Blackwood considered Diston a 'splendid journalist' and his first article written for Churchill went to print without change - this, according to David Lough, 'was the start of a partnership that would flourish for the rest of the decade'. By the end of the following year, Diston had already prepared most of Churchill's 'The Great Men I Have Known' series for the News of the World in Britain and Collier's in the US, due to appear from January 1936. Sir Emsley Carr, the British newspaper's chairman, enjoyed them so much he immediately signed up Churchill for a series in 1937. The News of the World would pay nearly £400 (£12,000 today) an article. Another of Churchill's ghostwriters was his Private Secretary Edward Marsh (who would at times receive up to 10% of Churchill's commission).

American novelist of the same name
In the late 1890s, Churchill's writings first came to be confused with those of his American contemporary Winston Churchill, a best-selling novelist. He wrote to his American counterpart about the confusion their names were causing among their readers, offering to sign his own works "Winston Spencer Churchill", adding the first half of his double-barrelled surname, Spencer-Churchill, which he did not otherwise use. After a few early editions the middle name was turned into an initial, his pen name subsequently appearing as "Winston S. Churchill".

The two men met on occasions when one of them happened to be in the other's country, but their diametrically opposed personalities prevented the development of a close friendship.

Non-fiction

Fiction

Collected speeches

There are around 135 published booklets of Churchill's individual speeches, including "Mr Winston Churchill on the Education Bill" (1902), "The Fiscal Puzzle: Both Sides Explained by Leading Men'" (1903), "Why I am a Free Trader" (1905) and "Prisons and Prisoners" (1910); the following are speeches published in a collected form.

Miscellany

Notes and references

Notes

References

Sources

External links

 
 
 
 
 Collected Churchill Podcasts and speeches
 
 The Churchill Centre website
 Winston Churchill Memorial and Library at Westminster College, Missouri
 Locations of correspondence and papers of Churchill at the UK National Archives

Bibliographies of British writers
Writer